Gastropholis echinata is a species of lizard found in Liberia, Ivory Coast, Ghana, Cameroon, Equatorial Guinea, Gabon, and the Democratic Republic of the Congo.

The Latin specific epithet of echinata refers to hedgehog, from echinus.

References

Gastropholis
Reptiles described in 1862
Taxa named by Edward Drinker Cope